Arıkaya can refer to:

 Arıkaya, Çameli
 Arıkaya, Kozluk